4543 Phoinix is a large Jupiter trojan from the Greek camp, approximately  in diameter. It was discovered on 2 February 1989, by American astronomer Carolyn Shoemaker at the Palomar Observatory in California. The assumed C-type asteroid is possibly elongated and has a longer-than-average rotation period of 38.9 hours. It is one of the 60 largest Jupiter trojans and was named after Phoenix (Phoinix) from Greek mythology.

Orbit and classification 

Phoinix is a dark Jovian asteroid orbiting in the leading Greek camp at Jupiter's  Lagrangian point, 60° ahead of the Gas Giant's orbit in a 1:1 resonance (see Trojans in astronomy). This asteroid is not a member of any asteroid family but belongs to the Jovian background population.

It orbits the Sun at a distance of 4.6–5.6 AU once every 11 years and 7 months (4,237 days; semi-major axis of 5.12 AU). Its orbit has an eccentricity of 0.10 and an inclination of 15° with respect to the ecliptic.

The body's observation arc begins with a precovery taken at Palomar in April 1955, nearly 34 years prior to its official discovery observation.

Physical characteristics 

Phoinix is a generically assumed C-type asteroid. Its V–I color index of 1.20 is the highest of all larger Jovian trojans, which are typically D-types with a V–I index near 0.90 (also see table below).

Rotation period 

In November 2011, a rotational lightcurve of Phoinix was obtained from photometric observations by Italian astronomer Albino Carbognani at the OAVdA Observatory , Italy, with follow-up observations conducted at Calar Alto Observatory by Stefano Mottola and Uri Carsenty the following month. Lightcurve analysis gave a rotation period of 38.866 hours with a brightness amplitude of at least 0.34 magnitude. While not being a slow rotator, Phoinix has a longer-than average period, especially for a large Jupiter trojan. Its relatively high brightness amplitude is indicative of a non-spherical, elongated shape.

Diameter and albedo 

According to the surveys carried out by the Japanese Akari satellite, the NEOWISE mission of NASA's Wide-field Infrared Survey Explorer, and the Infrared Astronomical Satellite IRAS, Phoinix measures between 62.79 and 69.54 kilometers in diameter and its surface has an albedo between 0.049 and 0.059.

The Collaborative Asteroid Lightcurve Link derives an albedo of 0.0540 and a diameter of 62.73 kilometers based on an absolute magnitude of 9.8.

Naming 

This minor planet was named by the discoverer from Greek mythology after Phoenix (Phoinix), a wise Greek leader in the Trojan War, who raised Achilles and convinced him to join the campaign. The official naming citation was published by the Minor Planet Center on 28 April 1991.

References

External links 
 Asteroid Lightcurve Database (LCDB), query form (info )
 Dictionary of Minor Planet Names, Google books
 Discovery Circumstances: Numbered Minor Planets (1)-(5000) – Minor Planet Center
 
 

004543
Discoveries by Carolyn S. Shoemaker
Named minor planets
19890202